Gilmore is a suburb in the Canberra, Australia district of Tuggeranong. The postcode is 2905.  The suburb is named after the poet and journalist, Dame Mary Gilmore. It was gazetted on 5 August 1975. Streets are named after journalists, particularly female journalists.

It is next to the suburbs of Macarthur and Chisholm and is bounded by the Monaro Highway, Isabella Drive and Hambidge Crescent.

Demographics

The median age of people in Gilmore was 37 years, compared to a median age of 35 for Canberra. The median weekly individual income for Gilmore in 2021 was $1,164, compared to the ACT average of $1,203, while the median weekly household income was $2,416. In 2021 the median monthly housing loan repayment in Gilmore was $2,048.

The residents of Gilmore are predominantly Australian born, with 79.5% being born in Australia. The five main countries of birth for those born overseas were England, 2.9%, New Zealand, 1.3%, India, 1.3%, Philippines, 1.2% and China, 0.7%. The most popular religious affiliations in descending order are no religion, Catholic and Anglican.

Suburb amenities

Gilmore Neighbourhood Oval is located on Heagney Crescent. The Rose Cottage heritage site is located off Isabella Drive is heritage listed and is open to the public. The site includes a nursery and craft centre. An ACTEW Electricity substation is located in Gilmore, with access off Isabella Drive.

Several ACTION bus routes service Gilmore. Routes 74 and 75 connects Gilmore to Tuggeranong Town Centre and Erindale Centre. It also services Chisholm and Richardson.

Politics

Gilmore is located within the federal electorate of Bean, which is represented by David Smith for Labor in the House of Representatives. In the ACT Legislative Assembly, Gilmore is part of the electorate of Brindabella, which elects five members on the basis of proportional representation, currently two Liberal, two Labor and one Greens. Polling place statistics are shown to the right for the Gilmore polling place at Gilmore Primary School in the 2022 federal and 2020 ACT elections.

Geology

Gilmore is built on volcanic rocks from the Silurian age.  The rock member is titled Deakin Volcanics. Rhyolite covers most of Gilmore except in the east where rhyodacite is found. These are from the Silurian age at 414 Mya.

References

Suburbs of Canberra